Colin O'Riordan (born 12 October 1995) is an Irish former professional Australian rules footballer for the Sydney Swans in the Australian Football League (AFL). Before leaving Ireland O'Riordan played Gaelic football as a midfielder for the Tipperary senior team.

Early life 
Born in Templemore, County Tipperary, O'Riordan first played competitive Gaelic games during his schooling at Our Lady's Secondary School. He arrived on the inter-county scene at the age of fifteen when he first linked up with the Tipperary minors teams as a dual player before later joining the under-21 sides.

O'Riordan's father, Michael, and his brothers, Kevin and Alan, have also played at various levels with Tipperary.

Gaelic Football 
O'Riordan made his senior debut during the 2014 league. O'Riordan immediately became a regular member of the starting fifteen and has won one National League (Division 4) medal.

At club level O'Riordan plays both Gaelic football and hurling with J. K. Bracken's.

On 22 November 2020, O'Riordan who had returned to Ireland had permission from the Sydney Swans to play for Tipperary in the 2020 Munster Final, which Tipperary won 0-17 to 0-14 against Cork.
It was Tipperary's first Munster title in 85 years.

In January 2021, O'Riordan was nominated for an All-Star award.

AFL 
In October 2015, O'Riordan signed a rookie contract with the Sydney Swans in the AFL.

In 2018, O'Riordan trained under 2005 premiership Swan Tadhg Kennelly. On 15 July 2018,  O'Riordan became the third Irish player to play for Sydney, making his debut in round 17 against North Melbourne.

In August 2022, O'Riordan announced his retirement from the AFL due to a chronic hip injury. He played 34 games since joining the Sydney Swans in October 2015.

Statistics
Updated to the end of round 23, 2022.

|-
| 2016
|  || 38 || 0 || – || – || – || – || – || – || – || – || – || – || – || – || – || –
|- 
| 2017
|  || 38 || 0 || – || – || – || – || – || – || – || – || – || – || – || – || – || –
|- 
| 2018
|  || 38 || 3 || 0 || 1 || 24 || 25 || 49 || 17 || 7 || 0.0 || 0.3 || 8.0 || 8.3 || 16.3 || 5.7 || 2.3
|-
| 2019
|  || 38 || 12 || 1 || 1 || 86 || 83 || 169 || 52 || 27 || 0.1 || 0.1 || 7.2 || 6.9 || 14.1 || 4.3 || 2.3
|- 
| 2020
| 
| 38 || 8 || 0 || 0 || 39 || 37 || 76 || 20 || 13 || 0.0 || 0.0 || 4.9 || 4.6 || 9.5 || 2.5 || 1.6
|-
| 2021
|  || 38 || 6 || 0 || 0 || 30 || 15 || 45 || 13 || 6 || 0.0 || 0.0 || 5.0 || 2.5 || 7.5 || 2.2 || 1.0
|- 
| 2022
|  || 38 || 5 || 0 || 0 || 21 || 15 || 36 || 9 || 1 || 0.0 || 0.0 || 4.2 || 3.0 || 7.2 || 1.8 || 0.2
|- class="sortbottom" 
! colspan=3| Career
! 34
! 1
! 2
! 200
! 175
! 375
! 111
! 54
! 0.0
! 0.1
! 5.9
! 5.1
! 11.0
! 3.3
! 1.6
|}

Honours 

Tipperary

National League (Division 4) (1): 2014
Munster Under-21 Football Championship (1): 2015 (c)
All-Ireland Minor Football Championship (1): 2011
Munster Minor Football Championship (2): 2011, 2012
Munster Senior Football Championship (1): 2020

Awards
EirGrid Under-21 Player of the Year (1): 2015

See also

 Irish experiment

References

External links

1995 births
Living people
J.K. Bracken's hurlers
J.K. Bracken's Gaelic footballers
Tipperary inter-county Gaelic footballers
Tipperary inter-county hurlers
People educated at Our Lady's Secondary School, Templemore